Canidia turnbowi is a species of longhorn beetles of the subfamily Lamiinae. It was described by Wappes and Lingafelter in 2005, and is known from Mexico.

References

Beetles described in 2005
Acanthocinini